Blue cheese dressing is a popular side sauce, salad dressing and dip in the United States. It is usually made of some combination of blue cheese, mayonnaise, and buttermilk, sour cream or yogurt, milk, vinegar, onion powder, and garlic powder. There is a blue cheese vinaigrette that consists of salad oil, blue cheese, vinegar, and sometimes seasonings.

Most major salad dressing producers and restaurants in the United States produce a variant of blue cheese dressing. It is commonly served as a dip with Buffalo wings or crudités (raw vegetables).

Culinary uses
In addition to being used as a salad dressing, blue cheese dressing pairs well with a number of ingredients like chicken, turkey, garlic bread, and corn. It can be used as a dressing for sandwiches or wraps or incorporated in dips with other ingredients like  cream cheese, sour cream, and hot sauce.

Safety and storage
Separation of water and oil (instability of the emulsion) is a potential problem with blue cheese dressing. Microbial spoilage is a concern for any type of processed food. Studies have shown that Saccharomyces bailii and Lactobacillus fructivorans are two common microorganisms that spoil salad dressings. Lactobacillus fructivorans is a facultative anaerobe that is acid tolerant, and can survive in a low pH food such as blue cheese dressing.

See also
 Cheese sauce
 List of dips
 Salad dressing

References 

Russian cuisine
Dips (food)
Salad dressings
American condiments